Chupin is a Russian masculine surname, its feminine counterpart is Chupina. It may refer to
Roger Chupin (1921–2002), French racing cyclist
Valeri Chupin (footballer, born 1961), Russian football coach and a former player 
Yevgeni Chupin (born 1980), Russian football player, son of Valeri
Alexei Chupin (born 1972), Russian ice hockey player

Russian-language surnames